Maria Susan Rye, (31 March 1829 – 12 November 1903), was a social reformer and a promoter of emigration from England, especially of young women living in Liverpool workhouses, to the colonies of the British Empire, especially Canada.

Early life
She was born at 2 Lower James Street, Golden Square, in central London, on 31 March 1829. She was the eldest of the nine children of Edward Rye, solicitor and bibliophile, and Maria Tuppen. Edward Rye of Baconsthorpe, Norfolk, was her grandfather. Of her brothers, Edward Caldwell Rye was an entomologist, and Walter Rye, solicitor, antiquary, and athlete, published works on Norfolk history and topography and was mayor of Norwich in 1908–9.

Maria Rye received her education at home and read for herself in the large library of her father.

Career
Coming under the influence of Charles Kingsley's father, then vicar of St Luke's Church, she devoted herself at the age of sixteen to parochial work in Chelsea. She was impressed by the lack of opportunity of employment for women outside the teaching profession. In succession to Mary Howitt, she soon became secretary of Langham Place, London#The Langham Place Group which promoted the Married Women's Property bill, which was brought forward by Sir Thomas Erskine Perry in 1856 but was not fully passed till 1882.

Rye joined the Society for Promoting the Employment of Women on its foundation, but, disapproving of the women's franchise movement which the leading members supported, soon left it. In 1859, she undertook a private law-stationer's business at 12 Portugal Street, Lincoln's Inn, in order to give employment to middle-class girls. At the same time, she helped to establish the Victoria Press in association with her business in 1860 (under the charge of Emily Faithfull), and the employment bureau and telegraph school in Great Coram Street, with Isa Craig as secretary. The telegraph school anticipated the employment of girls as telegraph clerks.

The law-stationer's business prospered, but the applications for employment were far in excess of the demands of the concern. With Jane Lewin, she consequently raised a fund for assisting middle-class girls to emigrate, and to the question of emigration she devoted the rest of her life.

Emigration
She founded, in 1861, the Female Middle Class Emigration Society (absorbed since 1884 in the United British Women's Emigration Association). Between 1860 and 1868, she was instrumental in sending girls of the middle class and domestic servants to Australia, New Zealand, and Canada. She visited these colonies to form committees for the protection of the emigrants.

Together with several governesses and over 100 women traveling in steerage, Rye sailed to New Zealand in 1863. There in Dunedin, she found the terrible conditions in which immigrant single women had been housed -- former military barracks with few amenities. She became the center of political and philanthropic controversies as she sought for reform from the provincial government's immigration offices. Within two years, she had traveled across New Zealand and found few opportunities for skilled, educated single women. Even in the more settled Canterbury region, Rye realized the scheme was not going to work since the local populace emphasized their need for domestic servants or marriageable farmhands.

From 1868, when she handed over her law business to Lewin, Rye devoted herself exclusively to the emigration of pauper children, or, in a phrase which she herself coined, 'gutter children.' After visiting in New York the Little Wanderers' Home for the training of derelict children for emigrant life which Mr. Van Meter, a Baptist minister from Ohio, had founded, she resolved to give the system a trial in London. Encouraged by Anthony Ashley-Cooper, 7th Earl of Shaftesbury and The Times newspaper and with the financial support of William Rathbone VI, M.P., in 1869 she purchased Avenue House, High Street, Peckham, and with her two younger sisters, in spite of public opposition and prejudice, took there from the streets or the workhouses waifs and strays from the ages of three to sixteen. Fifty girls from Kirkdale industrial school, Liverpool, were soon put under her care ; they were trained in domestic economy and went through courses of general and religious instruction.

At Niagara, Canada, Rye also acquired a building which she called 'Our Western Home.' It was opened on 1 December 1869. To this house Miss Rye drafted the children from Peckham, and after further training they were distributed in Canada as domestic servants among respectable families. The first party left England in October 1869. She received a civil list pension of £10 in 1871.

Poor law children were subsequently received at Peckham from St. George's, Hanover Square, Wolverhampton, Bristol, Reading, and other towns. By 1891 Rye had found homes in Canada for some five hundred children. She accompanied each batch of emigrants, and visited the children already settled there. The work was continued with great success for over a quarter of a century, and did much to diminish the vicious habits and the stigma of pauperism. Lord Shaftesbury remained a consistent supporter, and in 1884 Henry Petty-Fitzmaurice, 5th Marquess of Lansdowne, then governor-general of Canada, warmly commended the results of her pioneer system, which Thomas John Barnardo and others subsequently adopted and extended.

Later life
In 1895, owing to the continuous strain, Rye transferred the two institutions in Peckham and Niagara with their funds to the Church of England Waifs and Strays Society (now The Children's Society). In her farewell report of 1895 she stated that 4000 English and Scottish children then in Canada had been sent out from her home in England.

She retired with her sister Elizabeth to 'Baconsthorpe,' Hemel Hempstead, where she spent the remainder of her life. There she died, after four years' suffering, of intestinal cancer on 12 November 1903, and was buried in the churchyard.

See Also
 Barbara Leigh Smith Bodichon
 Bessie Rayner Parkes
 The Langham Place Group
 Society for Promoting the Employment of Women

References

Further reading

Attribution

External links

 Biography at the Dictionary of Canadian Biography Online
 Young Immigrants to Canada
 Female Middle Class Emigration Society,  Women's Library , Appendix 1.4
 British Home Child Group International

English social justice activists
1829 births
1903 deaths
English women activists
English philanthropists
British social reformers
Child welfare in the United Kingdom
Child welfare in Canada
History of women in Canada
19th-century British philanthropists